The Fort Gaines Cemetery Site is a prehistoric mound, an archeological site, within the Fort Gaines Cemetery in Fort Gaines, Georgia.

As of 1974 it had not been excavated.

References

Archaeological sites on the National Register of Historic Places in Georgia (U.S. state)
National Register of Historic Places in Clay County, Georgia
Archaeological sites in Georgia (U.S. state)